Carrickfergus Sailing Club is located in Carrickfergus, Northern Ireland on the north shore of Belfast Lough. The club was founded in 1866. The clubhouse moved from the building on stilts beside Carrickfergus Harbour to its current location beside Carrickfergus Marina in 1984.

The club is one of the clubs on the lough that form part of the Belfast Lough Yachting Conference

The clubhouse was destroyed by a fire which started around 2330 BST on 22 June 2012, thought to have been caused by an electrical fault.

Racing

The club runs various racing series throughout the year starting with the Spring Series at the end of March through to the Frosty Series ending mid December. Primarily the racing is for IRC, PY, White Sail, Flying Fifteen, Squib and Ruffian 23 classes.
 Spring Series – late March to late April
 Tuesday Series – early May to early July
 Thursday Series - early May to early July
 Late Series - late July to late August
 Autumn Series - early September to late October
 Frosty Series - late October to mid December - discontinued 2016 due to low interest numbers
There are several other one- and two-day events for cruisers throughout the season
 Mid Lough Open (in association with Royal Ulster and Ballyholme Yacht Clubs
 Castle Cup
 Menagerie Race

The club also hosts open regional and national level events for various classes. In recent years this has included Flying Fifteen, Squib, Topper, Mirror, J/24, Ruffian 23

References

External links
 Carrickfergus Sailing Club

Yacht clubs in Northern Ireland
Sports clubs in County Antrim
Carrickfergus
1866 establishments in Ireland